The 2012 Kenyan Premier League (known as the Tusker Premier League for sponsorship reasons) was the ninth season of the Kenyan Premier League since its establishment in 2003 and the forty-ninth season of top division football in Kenya since 1963. It began on 11 February with Tusker and Nairobi City Stars and ended on 10 November with Oserian and Rangers. The winners of the league will earn a place at the preliminary round of the 2013 CAF Champions League and play against the 2012 FKF President's Cup champions at the 2013 Kenyan Super Cup.

The defending champions Tusker, who also became the defending champions of the Kenyan Super Cup after beating Gor Mahia, the defending champions of the FKF Cup, earlier in the year, won their tenth league title after beating Nairobi City Stars 3−0 away at the Hope Centre. Gor Mahia, the former league leaders with 58 points (Tusker were second with 57), needed a win against Thika United to clinch a record thirteenth title, but the match ended in a 1−1 draw. A.F.C. Leopards, who were third with 57 points (Tusker were ahead on goal difference), also needed a win for a chance at a record thirteenth title as well, but lost 1−0 away to Chemelil Sugar.

A total of 16 teams are competed for the league, with fourteen returning from the 2011 season and one promoted from the FKL Nationwide League and the KFF Nationwide League, which were joint to make FKF Division One after the 2011 season. FKL champions Oserian and KFF champions Muhoroni Youth were promoted, while Congo JMJ United and Bandari, finishing last and second-last respectively, were relegated. Oserian were relegated at the end of the season, along with Rangers.

The league was halted at the end of 20 May to give teams a chance to rest and make possible changes in their squads during the mid-year transfer window. Matches resumed on 23 June.

On 21 August, the Kenyan Premier League and East African Breweries signed a KSh.170 million/= (US$2.02 million; £1.28 million sterling; €1.62 million) deal to rename the league to the Tusker Premier League, making it the most lucrative deal in Kenyan football history.

Changes from last season

Relegated from Premier League
 Bandari
 Congo JMJ United

Promoted from FKL and KFF
 Oserian
 Muhoroni Youth

Teams
Several teams share common stadiums in the league, the most shared being the Nyayo National Stadium, by A.F.C. Leopards, Muhoroni Youth, Rangers and Sofapaka.

Half of all the 16 teams are based in Nairobi.

Stadia and locations

Personnel and kits
As of September 24, 2012.

Managerial changes
As of September 24, 2012.

League table

Positions by round
The table lists the positions of teams after each week of matches. In order to preserve chronological evolvements, any postponed matches are not included to the round at which they were originally scheduled, but added to the full round they were played immediately afterwards. For example, if a match is scheduled for matchday 13, but then postponed and played between days 16 and 17, it will be added to the standings for day 16.

Results

Top scorers

Last updated: 10 November 2012

See also
 2012 Kenyan Women's Premier League
 2012 FKF President's Cup
 2012 KPL Top 8 Cup
 2012 Kenyan Super Cup

References

Kenya
Kenyan
Kenya
Kenyan
1
2012